Eduardo José Maceira Galarraga (born 30 April 1996) is a Venezuelan footballer who plays for Spanish club Almagro CF as a left winger.

Football career
Maceira was born in Caracas, and finished his formation with Deportivo La Guaira. He made his professional – and Primera División – debut on 22 May 2013, coming on as a second-half substitute in a 1–2 away loss against Mineros de Guayana.

On 15 August 2014, Maceira moved abroad and joined University of South Florida's South Florida Bulls. In 2016, he moved to Campbell University and was assigned to the soccer side Fighting Camels.

In February 2017, Maceira joined Albacete Balompié and was assigned to the reserves in Tercera División. On 13 July, he moved to Segunda División B side San Fernando CD.

References

External links

1996 births
Living people
Footballers from Caracas
Venezuelan footballers
Association football wingers
Venezuelan Primera División players
Deportivo La Guaira players
South Florida Bulls men's soccer players
Segunda División B players
Tercera División players
Atlético Albacete players
AD Almudévar players
Campbell University alumni
Venezuelan expatriate footballers
Venezuelan expatriate sportspeople in the United States
Venezuelan expatriate sportspeople in Spain
Expatriate footballers in Spain
Expatriate soccer players in the United States
Campbell Fighting Camels soccer players